Maharashtra is leading state in construction of Expressways in India. The first expressway between Mumbai and Pune the Mumbai Pune Expressway was build by Maharashtra State Road Development Corporation in 2001.
Currently India longest expressway the Mumbai Nagpur Expressway known as Sumruddhi Mahamarg is open for public on 11 December 2022 by Prime Minister Nerendra Modi.

Maharashtra Government planning to construct more than 5000 km Expressway in next few year.

State Expressways 
State Expressways are funded by State and Central Governments to connect areas within the state. These expressways reduce travel time, allowing for more efficient travel and fuel savings. This also allows for a more equal distribution of goods, especially to rural areas. These expressways are not part of National Expressways but may be operated by the state authority or national authority.

Note: AC = Access-Controlled Expressway. GS = Grade Separated Expressway.

Bypass Expressways(to bypass traffic within same city or between two cities) 

Bypass Expressways to bypass city traffic like ring roads, bypasses, freeways, and elevated roads exist entirely within a city or between two cities. These expressways direct heavy traffic to the outskirts freeing city roads of traffic. This also allows outside traffic to directly pass the city instead of going through it further limiting traffic within a city..

Note: AC = Access-Controlled Expressway. GS = Grade Separated Expressway.

Expressways under-construction 
* Ready to inaugurate

Proposed expressways

References